Time Is My Enemy is a 1954 British crime film directed by Don Chaffey and starring Dennis Price, Renée Asherson and Patrick Barr.

Plot
Small-time crook Radley (Dennis Price) returns after a long absence to discover his wife Barbara (Renee Asherson) has remarried, believing him killed in the Blitz. Finding her happily married to wealthy publisher John Everton (Patrick Barr), Radley begins blackmailing Barbara for £500 to keep their previous marriage quiet. When Radley kills a jeweller in a robbery, he is blackmailed by his roommate, so in turn threatens to also blackmail John Everton for £500. When she arrives at Radley's flat to pay the final instalment, he provokes her into shooting him. After surrendering herself to the police, Barbara discovers that all is not as it seems, Radley is wanted for more than one murder; and the police begin to question whether Radley is really dead after all.

Cast

 Dennis Price as Martin Radley
 Renée Asherson as Barbara Everton
 Patrick Barr as John Everton
 Duncan Lamont as Inspector Charles Wayne
 Susan Shaw as Evelyn Gower
 Bonar Colleano as Harry Bond
 Alfie Bass as Ernie Gordon
 Agnes Lauchlan as Aunt Laura
 Brenda Hogan as Diana
 Barbara Grayley as Betty the maid
 Mavis Villiers as Gladys
 William Franklyn as Peter Thompson
 Dandy Nichols as Mrs. Budd
 Erik Chitty as Ballistics Expert
 Howard Layton as Surgeon
 Neil Wilson as Doctor
 Alastair Hunter as Bookmaker
 Bruce Beeby as Room-mate
 Nigel Neilson as Hubert
 Audrey Hessey as Airport Receptionist

References

External links

1954 films
British crime films
1954 crime films
1950s English-language films
Films directed by Don Chaffey
Films set in London
British black-and-white films
1950s British films